Maqamat may have the following meanings:

Plural for Maqam (disambiguation)
Plural for Maqama, an Arabic literary tradition
Maqamat Badi' az-Zaman al-Hamadhani, an Arabic collection of stories from the 9th century